The Journal of the American Society of Nephrology is a peer-reviewed medical journal covering nephrology. It was established in 1966 and is published by the American Society of Nephrology. The editor-in-chief is Josephine P. Briggs. According to the Journal Citation Reports, the journal has a 2020 impact factor of 10.121, ranking it first in the field of nephrology.

Abstracting and indexing
The journal is abstracted and indexed in the following databases:

References

External links

Nephrology journals
Academic journals published by learned and professional societies of the United States
Publications established in 2006
Monthly journals
English-language journals